Arthur Thomas Thrupp (8 June 1828 – 4 May 1889) was an officer of the British Royal Navy during the Crimean War and the Second Opium War, who held several sea commands, including , which he deliberately beached at the isolated Île Saint-Paul when she became unseaworthy.

Early life
Born in 1828 at Paddington to prosperous Grosvenor Square coachbuilder Charles Joseph Thrupp and Harriet Thrupp née Styan, and the younger brother of George Athelstane Thrupp, Thrupp entered the Royal Navy in 1843.

Military career
Thrupp became a lieutenant on 25February 1852 and served as lieutenant of HMS Cruiser, which saw service in the Baltic from 1854 to 1855 during the Crimean War. As lieutenant of HMS Nimrod, he saw service in the Far East during the Second Opium War (18561860), and was mentioned in dispatches for services at the capture of the Taku (Peiho) Forts on 20May 1858.

Thrupp was promoted to commander on 17September 1858, and served as commander aboard HMS Desperate in the North American Station and the West Indies, from 30July 1862 to 7November 1863.

Promoted to captain on 16December 1865, Thrupp was in command of HMS Megaera when she was wrecked on St. Paul Island in the Antarctic in 1871. He was completely exonerated by the ensuing court martial and subsequently served as captain of HMS Topaze from 21July 1874 to 22May 1877.

From 1879 to 1881 he served as naval aide-de-camp to Queen Victoria. On 31December 1881, he was promoted to rear-admiral, and on 7July 1885 to retired rear-admiral. His final promotion was on 19June 1888 when he was promoted to vice-admiral on the retired list.

Later life
Thrupp died at Bideford, Devon on 4 May 1889 at the age of 60.

Notes

References

1828 births
1889 deaths
Royal Navy vice admirals
Royal Navy officers
Royal Navy personnel of the Crimean War
Royal Navy personnel of the Second Opium War